Wang Jingchun (born 12 February 1973) is a Chinese actor.

Awards 

He won the Best Actor Award at the Tokyo International Film Festival in 2013 for his performance in Ning Ying's film To Live and Die in Ordos. In 2019, he won the Silver Bear for Best Actor at the 69th Berlin International Film Festival for his role in Wang Xiaoshuai's film So Long, My Son, while his co-star Yong Mei won the Silver Bear for Best Actress.

References

21st-century Chinese male actors
20th-century Chinese male actors
Chinese male film actors
1973 births
Living people
People from Altay Prefecture
Male actors from Xinjiang
Shanghai Theatre Academy alumni
Chinese male television actors
Silver Bear for Best Actor winners